"Endless Rain" is the fourth single released by Japanese heavy metal band X Japan (then named X) on December 1, 1989. It is their second single on a major record label and reached number 3 on the Oricon chart.

Summary 
The title track is taken from the group's breakthrough album Blue Blood, and is their first ballad released as a single. The B-side is a live version of the song "X", recorded on June 10, 1989 at Hibiya Yagai Ongaku.

Yoshiki said that "Endless Rain" is the first ballad he ever wrote, previously he was only writing heavy music and thrash metal. He explained that after members of Sony saw him play a composition by Pyotr Ilyich Tchaikovsky on piano while X was waiting to play at a club, they asked him to write a ballad. The resulting song was "Endless Rain". Yoshiki said the song became a hit and was a shock to their fans, but they eventually came to like it and it became "X Japan's theme song."

Rolling Stone referred to the song as "November Rain, minus the bullshit" and called it X's first big chart hit.

A live performance of "Endless Rain" was included as the B-side to their 1990 single "Week End"'.

In South Korea, Japanese popular culture was banned in 1990s. However, at the time, "Endless Rain" became a hit song on the gilboard charts (streetboard charts) by the street vendors, and very large numbers of Korean people knew this song, as the street vendors persistently played this song from their boomboxes everywhere.

During Guns N' Roses' July 2007 Japanese concerts, Richard Fortus and Robin Finck performed part of "Endless Rain" during their guitar duets. "Endless Rain" was covered by Japanese singers Angela Aki, at one of her concerts, and Ayumi Nakamura, on her 2008 album "Voice", and by Hong Kong singer Aaron Kwok at one of his concerts. It was also used as the theme song for the movie Zipang.

In December 2020, Yoshiki performed the song at the 71st NHK Kōhaku Uta Gassen of New Year's Eve, along with Babymetal, Roger Taylor and Brian May of Queen, Sarah Brightman, SixTones, LiSA, and Milet.

Music videos
Two music videos have been created for "Endless Rain". The first was included on the Shigeki! Visual Shock Vol. 2 home video in 1989.

The second was released on the X Japan Showcase in L.A. Premium Prototype DVD on September 6, 2010. Directed by Russell Thomas and featuring the band performing live on top of the Kodak Theatre in Hollywood, California in January 2010, it has the sound of the audience added to the audio.

On November 21, 1993, SME Records released , a short film based on the manga series X by Clamp and set to X Japan's music. It features a slideshow of the manga's artwork set to a medley of X Japan's "Silent Jealousy", "Kurenai" and "Endless Rain" and a music video for the song "X" directed by Shigeyuki Hayashi.

Commercial performance 
The single reached number 3 on the Oricon charts, and charted for 31 week. In 1990, with 357,680 copies sold was the 21st best-selling single of the year, being certified Gold by RIAJ.

Track listing

Personnel 
X
Toshi – vocals
Pata – guitar
hide – guitar
Taiji – bass
Yoshiki – drums, piano

Other
Mixing engineer – Motonari Matsumoto
Recording engineers – Gremlin, Tetsuhiro Miyajima, Mitsuyasu Abe
Assistant engineers – Takashi Ohkubo, Fujishima, Naoki Yamada, Akiko Nakamura, Shigeki Kashii, Lee Chun Fin, Mitsumasa Iwata
Orchestral arrangements – Neko Saitō

References 

X Japan songs
Songs written by Yoshiki (musician)
Heavy metal ballads
1989 singles
Japanese-language songs
1989 songs
Japanese film songs